Big Ant Studios Pty Ltd is an Australian video game developer based in Melbourne. Founded in 2001 by chief executive officer Ross Symons, the company specialises in the development of sports games. Big Ant's games include Cricket 19, Rugby League Live 4, AFL Live, and Don Bradman Cricket 14.

History 
The studio was founded in 2001 and was originally named Bull Ant Studios, but renamed as "it was getting mispronounced all around the world because they don’t have bull ants", according to Ross Symons. The studio initially worked primarily as a "studio for hire" with publishers such as THQ and Konami before moving towards sports games. Symons has explained this move on the basis that "Sport is renewable. There’s always a sequel. There’s always another season”.

The studio's first sports game was Australian rules football title AFL Live, released in 2011, for the PC, PlayStation 3 and Xbox 360. The studio has since gone to make further Australian rules football games, as well as rugby league, cricket, lacrosse and tennis titles.

In January 2021, French video game publisher Nacon acquired Big Ant for €35 million. Symons has commented on his ambition "to grow Big Ant Studios into the largest developer of sports entertainment software in the world", and increase staff numbers from 66 (as of April 2022) to 200.

Games developed

Advocacy 
Symons opined in a 2016 Australian Financial Review piece that interns should be properly compensated for their work. Big Ant Studios joined the Interactive Games and Entertainment Association (IGEA) in December 2015. Symons made a presentation on the games industry challenges and opportunities to the Australian government's new Parliamentary Friends of Video Games group. In 2021 Symons was added to the IGEA's board of directors.

Big Ant Studios sponsors the women's team at the Carlton Football Club.

Notes

References

External links 
 

Companies based in Melbourne
Australian companies established in 2001
Video game companies established in 2001
Video game companies of Australia
Video game development companies
2021 mergers and acquisitions
Australian subsidiaries of foreign companies
Nacon